Greatest Hits is a compilation album by American recording artist Dan Fogelberg. It included two previously unreleased tracks, "Missing You" and "Make Love Stay", both of which were released as singles and peaked at chart positions #23 and #29 on the Billboard Hot 100 chart, respectively. Both of the new songs made the Top 10 on the adult contemporary chart, with "Missing You" rising to #6 and "Make Love Stay" becoming the singer's third #1 on the AC chart.

Track listing 
 "Part of the Plan" (from Souvenirs) - 3:18
 "Heart Hotels" (from Phoenix) - 4:14
 "Hard to Say" (from The Innocent Age) - 3:59
 "Longer" (from Phoenix) - 3:15
 "Missing You" (previously unreleased) - 4:40
 "The Power Of Gold" (from Twin Sons of Different Mothers) - 4:30
 "Make Love Stay" (previously unreleased) - 4:35
 "Leader of the Band" (from The Innocent Age) - 4:17
 "Run for the Roses" (from The Innocent Age) - 4:16
 "Same Old Lang Syne" (from The Innocent Age) - 5:19

All songs written by Daniel Fogelberg.

Charts
Album

Personnel 
Dan Fogelberg - lead vocals, backing vocals, electric guitar, acoustic guitar, Prophet V synthesizer, string arrangements
Glen Spreen - string arrangements
Kenny Passarelli, Norbert Putnam - bass guitar
Sid Sharp - concertmaster
Joe Vitale - drums
Russ Kunkel - drums, congas 
Mike Hanna - keyboards, piano, synthesizer
Joe Lala - percussion 
Al Garth - soprano saxophone
Henry Diltz - photography

References

External links 
Dan Fogelberg official site
The Fogelberg Page — The Original Fogelberg Site since 1996!

1982 greatest hits albums
Dan Fogelberg albums
Albums produced by Norbert Putnam